Patulul is a town, with a population of 11,343 (2018 census), and a municipality in the Suchitepéquez department of Guatemala.

It is located north of the coastal region of Tiquisate. It is both a coastal region as well as a mountainous region. Its neighboring town, San Juan Bautista (Saint John the Baptist) is known for its fine dairy products. They both have their town festivals during the month of July.

References 

Municipalities of the Suchitepéquez Department